Shruti Sawant better known by her stage name Ineya, is an Indian actress and model from Thiruvananthapuram, Kerala who predominantly appears in Malayalam and Tamil films. She won the Best Actress Award for her role in the Tamil film Vaagai Sooda Vaa (2011) at TN state awards.

Early life
Ineya, whose real name is Shruti Sawant was born to Salahuddin. S and Savithri at Thiruvananthapuram, Kerala. She has an elder sister, Swathi, who is also a Malayalam television actress and a younger brother, Sravan. Ineya had her primary education at Thiruvananthapuram from Amritha Vidyalaya, Fort Girls Mission High School and Manakkad Karthika Thirunnal High School. She did her B.B.A course by correspondence.

Career
Ineya acted in several Malayalam television series, short films and telefilms as a child artist. While studying in class four, she acted in the telefilm Koottilekku, which was followed by appearances in tele-serials Orma  and Sree Guruvayoorappan by Vayalar Madhavan Kutty. Ineya won the Miss Trivandrum title in 2005, following which she did modeling and appeared in several television advertisements as well as a number of Malayalam award-winning art films, including Saira (2006), directed Dr. Biju, Dalamarmarangal (2009) and Umma (2011), both directed by Vijayakrishnan. She also played a pivotal role in Rajesh Touchriver's short feature The Sacred Face, which focusses on child abuse.

In 2010, she starred in a Tamil film Padagasalai and signed up four more Tamil films, all of which were cancelled or remain unreleased. She next played a supporting role as the sister to Cheran's character in Mysskin's mystery thriller Yuddham Sei. Director A. Sarkunam signed her for the female lead character in his period piece Vaagai Sooda Vaa (2011), for which she changed her screen name to Ineya. Her portrayal of a tea stall owner was lauded by critics. Pavithra Srinivasan of Rediff wrote that she was a "welcome find", describing her as "natural, appealing, and very expressive". She played as a medical student and love interest of the hero in the film Mouna Guru co-starring Arulnidhi. Bharathiraja signed her for his film Annakodiyum Kodiveeranum, being impressed with her performance in Vaagai Sooda Vaa, but after the script was changed, her role was removed from the film.

She was part of a number of offbeat films in Malayalam like Ayaal, Bhoopadathil Illatha Oridam and Radio. In 2014, she was first seen as herself in Vikraman's Ninaithathu Yaaro then in Pulivaal, the Tamil remake of the Malayalam film Chaappa Kurishu and Naan Sigappu Manithan. In her only Malayalam release of 2014, Madhu Kaithapram's Vellivelichathil (In the Limelight), she played the role of a dancer.

Filmography

Films

Television
Serials

Shows

Other Works

Awards
Tamil Nadu State Film Awards
 2011: Best Actress – Vaagai Sooda Vaa

Kerala Film Critics Association Awards
 2018: Second Best Actress – Pengalila, Parole

References

External links

 

Actresses in Tamil cinema
Actresses in Malayalam cinema
Indian film actresses
Living people
Actresses from Thiruvananthapuram
Indian television actresses
Actresses in Malayalam television
21st-century Indian actresses
Tamil Nadu State Film Awards winners
Female models from Thiruvananthapuram
Actresses in Tamil television
1988 births